"Blue Jeans" is the second single from the album Light & Magic by the music group Ladytron. A rockier version titled "Blue Jeans 2.0" featured on the mix compilation Softcore Jukebox.

The music video of "Blue Jeans" featured the band members and a drummer playing the song in a white room. The video was filmed in black and white with a blue tint added. The audio track is "Blue Jeans 2.0" instead of the original song.

Track listing

CD single
 "Blue Jeans" (single version) – 3:46 	
 "Blue Jeans" (Josh Wink's Vocal Interpretation) – 6:06 	
 "Seventeen" (Slam Remix) – 7:28

7"
 "Blue Jeans" (single version)	
 "Blue Jeans" (Interpol Remix)

12"
 "Blue Jeans" (single version)	
 "Blue Jeans" (Josh Wink's Vocal Interpretation)	
 "Blue Jeans" (Josh Wink's Dub Interpretation)

Charts

References

2003 singles
Ladytron songs
2002 songs
Songs written by Daniel Hunt